3LK may stand for:
the 3Live Kru, a stable in Total Nonstop Action Wrestling
3LK, the former callsign of a radio station 3WM in Horsham, Victoria, Australia